Inguadona is an unincorporated community in Cass County, Minnesota, United States. It is near Longville and Remer along Cass County Road 7, near 28th Avenue NE. Inguadona is located within Inguadona and Trelipe Townships.

The word Inguadona is Sioux in origin, and is reported to mean "End of the trail."

References

Unincorporated communities in Cass County, Minnesota
Unincorporated communities in Minnesota